Major General Horatio Gordon Robley (28 June 1840 – 29 October 1930) was a British soldier who fought in colonial wars in New Zealand, Mauritius, South Africa, and Sri Lanka. He made drawings of Māori people and life  Māori culture  and collected some Māori items.

Early life
Robley was born at Funchal, Madeira on 28 June 1840, the son of Captain John Horatio Robley and Augusta June Penfold. Robley followed in his father's footsteps and became a professional soldier. However he also inherited his mother's artistic skills and became an accomplished sketcher and watercolourist.

Military career
In 1858 Robley purchased an ensigncy in the 68th (The Durham) Regiment of Foot (Light Infantry) for £450. After a short period of training in Ireland he joined his regiment in Burma where he remained for nearly five years. There he observed the people and learned the language. In addition to his military duties Robley continued with his sketching and made visits into the countryside to document daily life. When sketching Buddhist temples he became friendly with several Buddhist monks and had an image of the Buddha tattooed in red on his right arm. This was the start of a lifelong interest in the practice of tattooing. The numerous sketches made during this period formed the basis for his illustrations some years later, when he was asked by the firm Cassells & Co. to contribute to their publication, Races of Mankind.

In 1860 Robley was sent home to England for a period of sick leave. He began to specialise in rifle shooting, applying for and being granted a term in the School of Musketry. Rejoining his regiment he was present at the siege of Delhi (1857); afterwards, at Rangoon, he assumed command of the guard of the exiled Mughal Bahadur Shah II.

Service in New Zealand
In 1863 the 68th Regiment left Burma for the New Zealand Wars and landed at Auckland, New Zealand on 8 January 1864. Again displaying a desire to absorb his new surroundings, Robley purchased a Māori vocabulary and other books about Māori. In the following April, Robley took his troops to Tauranga to join General Cameron's forces attacking Pukehinahina also known as Gate Pā. British forces suffered a humiliating defeat in the Battle of Gate Pā on 29 April 1864, with 31 killed and 80 wounded despite vastly outnumbering their Māori foe. Gate Pā was the single most devastating defeat suffered by the British military in the New Zealand wars: while British casualties totalled more than a third of the storming party, Māori losses totalled about 25.

Robley remained at Tauranga for 19 months until the beginning of 1866 during which time he continued drawing. He completed a series of detailed sketches of the Māori defences at Pukehinahina and continued his interest in tattooing and completed accurate sketches of the tattoo designs of the wounded and dead. Several of these scenes were later reproduced in the Illustrated London News between 1864 and 1867.

During his time in New Zealand he met Herete Mauao and they had a son whom they named Hamiora Tu Ropere.

His regiment was withdrawn from Tauranga early in 1866 and sailed from Auckland arriving back in England at Spithead on 28 June 1866.

Later life
In 1870 Robley purchased a captaincy for £1,100, and on 4 February 1871 transferred to the 91st (Princess Louise's Argyllshire Highlanders) Regiment. He remained on Home Service until 1880, when he was promoted to major and dispatched to Mauritius. Later he was sent to South Africa and saw service in Cape Colony, Natal and Zululand. He then went to Ceylon where, in 1882, he was promoted to Lieutenant-Colonel and assumed command of the regiment. He wrote his regiment's history. In 1887 he retired from the Army with the rank of Major-General and returned to live in London.

Continuing with writing after his retirement, he returned to his interest in tattoos and wrote two books relating to his time in New Zealand, Moko or Maori Tattooing in 1896 and Pounamu: Notes on New Zealand Greenstone. In the first book, as well as demonstrating and explaining the art of Māori tattooing, he also wrote chapters on the dried tattooed heads or Mokomokai.  Robley decided to acquire as many examples of Mokomokai as possible, and at length built up a unique collection of 35 heads. In 1908 he offered them to the New Zealand Government for £1,000; his offer, however, was refused. Later, with the exception of the five best examples which Robley retained, the collection was purchased by the American Museum of Natural History, New York, for the equivalent of £1,250.

Robley also collected Māori antiquities. Some of his collection was purchased by the collector William Ockelford Oldman whose collection was purchased by the New Zealand Government in 1948.

Robley maintained a lively correspondence with a number of New Zealanders and maintained close links with New Zealand House during his lifetime. He died in London on 29 October 1930.

Gallery

Publications

References

Further reading
 
Major-General Horatio Gordon Robley 1966 Encyclopedia of New Zealand
 Robley Family Genealogy
 Digitized version of Robley – Soldier with a Pencil by L.W. Martin;  New Zealand Electronic Text Centre; 2007; Wellington, New Zealand
 Robley: Te Ropere 1840 – 1930 by Timothy Walker; University of Auckland; 1985

External links

 
 Works associated with Horatio Gordon Robley in the collection of the Museum of New Zealand Te Papa Tongarewa including drawings, collection items and images
 Robley discussed in RNZ podcast Black Sheep. 29 October 2018

1840 births
1930 deaths
British Army generals
British military personnel of the New Zealand Wars
British art collectors
New Zealand art collectors
People from British Burma